Sam Grahamslaw (born 24 February 1999) is a Scottish rugby union player who plays for Jersey Reds in the RFU Championship. Grahamslaw's primary position is loosehead prop.

Rugby Union career

Early career
Grahamslaw started playing his early rugby for Market Harborough RUFC, in Leicestershire, before selection for Leicester Tigers Elite Player Development Group. He joined Tigers under 18s academy in 2015, where he played as a back row. He joined Tigers Senior Academy in 2017, converting to his current position as a prop and was selected for England under 18s. He played for Scotland under 20s in the 2018 World Rugby Under 20 Championship and the 2019 Six Nations Under 20s Championship.

Professional career

Grahamslaw signed his first professional contract for Edinburgh Rugby in July 2020. He made his debut for Edinburgh in Round 5 of the 2020–21 Pro14 against Cardiff Blues.

Grahamslaw was released by Edinburgh at the conclusion of the 2021–22 United Rugby Championship season. He signed for Jersey Reds ahead of the 2022-23 RFU Championship season.

Education
Grahamslaw studied at Loughborough University whilst playing for Leicester Tigers and Heriot-Watt University whilst playing for Edinburgh Rugby, graduating with a first class degree in Mechanical Engineering in the summer of 2022.

External links
 itsrugby Profile

References

1999 births
Living people
Edinburgh Rugby players
Rugby union props
Rugby union players from Leicestershire
Leicester Tigers players
Jersey Reds players
Alumni of the University of Edinburgh
Alumni of Loughborough University
Rugby union players from Paris
English people of Scottish descent
Scottish rugby union players
English rugby union players